KILR-FM (95.9 FM) is a commercial radio station serving the Estherville, Iowa area, as well as the Iowa Great Lakes region.  The station broadcasts a Country format.  KILR is licensed to Jacobson Broadcasting Company, Inc which is owned by Roger J. and Barbara J. Jacobson.

They also own sister station KILR (AM). The AM-FM studios, transmitter and tower are located northeast of Estherville along Iowa Highway 4. The station first signed on in October 1969 with 3,000 watts.

A new transmitter site was be located about 10 miles southwest of Estherville. As of January 2017, that facility change never took place. According to records, it's still out on Highway 4.

References

External links

ILR
1969 establishments in Iowa
Radio stations established in 1969
Country radio stations in the United States